Fast File System may refer to:

 Berkeley Fast File System, as used by the various BSD variants
 Amiga Fast File System, as used by AmigaOS